The Something to Be Tour is the debut concert tour by American recording artist and Matchbox Twenty frontman, Rob Thomas. Visiting numerous countries in North America, Europe, Australia and Asia, the tour supported his first solo record, ...Something to Be. The tour began in April 2005
, shortly after the release of the album. As the popularity of the album grew, the tour venues progressed from nightclubs to theatres to arenas and amphitheaters.

Background

Shortly after ending the More Than You Think You Are Tour with Matchbox Twenty, Rob Thomas began recording his solo effort. Described as a fusion of adult contemporary and pop music, the album was tooled to distinguish Thomas from his popular band. As the first single hit airwaves, Thomas announced he would embark on a mini-club tour in the United States to help promote the record. Thomas wanted to focus on his solo material but understood that many fans of Matchbox Twenty would also be in the audience. He remarked, "I play the matchbox songs in the way I wrote them Then I don't use any of other parts the guys wrote. You want to ride that line because some of the fans came because they are fans of [M]atchbox [T]wenty and then there has to be that [musical] element of the reason you are on a break" As the popularity of the single grew, Thomas expanded his tour to England, Germany, Australia and Japan. Additionally, Thomas performed at several notable concert events including Live 8 in Philadelphia.

"The tour was amazing. That was, I think, just a really big…you know the only bad thing about it was there were only ten shows and we were done and we were ready for more. But I mean, I think it's been great. A lot of these songs were the kind of songs that, as you’re writing them and recording them, you’re thinking about you know you want to play them live. So a lot of them were born to be good live songs too." In October 2005, Thomas embarked on a full throttle tour of the U.S. performing in theatres. From there, Thomas journeyed to Australia  to begin his trek into arenas. During the summer of 2006, Thomas co-headlined the tour with singer, Jewel. Many of Thomas' concerts benefited the Sweet Relief Musicians Fund and victims of Hurricane Katrina.

Opening acts
Beth Hart (North America—Leg 1)
Lisa Miskovsky (Europe)
Antigone Rising (North America—Leg 2) (select shows)
Anna Nalick (North America—Leg 2)  (select shows)
John Nicholls (North America—Leg 3, Vermont)
Jewel (North America—Leg 4)  (select shows)
Jason Mraz (North America—Leg 4)  (select shows)
Toby Lightman (North America—Leg 4)  (select shows)

Setlist

Additional notes
During the European leg, "Time After Time" replaced "Push" during performances in Germany.
During the first Australian leg, Thomas performed "Father Figure" during the encore section.
During the performances at the Rod Laver Arena in Melbourne, Victoria, Australia; Thomas performed "Bright Lights" in lieu of "The Chain".
During the performance at Challenge Stadium in Perth, Western Australia, Australia; Thomas performed "Dancing in the Dark" in lieu of "You Know Me".
For the final North American leg, Thomas performed "Stop Draggin' My Heart Around" as a duet with Jewel. The song was performed in lieu of "The Chain"
During the performance at the Red Rocks Amphitheatre in Morrison, Colorado; Thomas performed "Now Comes the Night" in lieu of "Unwell".

Tour dates

Cancellations and rescheduled shows

Broadcasts and recordings
The summer tour was filmed at the Red Rocks Amphitheatre in Morrison, Colorado. Initially filmed for a PBS Soundstage special, the concert was later released on DVD, entitled, "Something to Be Tour—Live at Red Rocks". The performances of "My, My, My" and "Stop Draggin' My Heart Around". A special performance of "Bent" took the place of "My, My, My" and the acoustic, "Now Comes the Night" was performed for the taping instead of "Push".

References

2005 concert tours
2006 concert tours
Rob Thomas (musician) concert tours